Pierre Aquilina (born 3 November 1977 in Malta) is a former professional footballer who spent most of his career with Maltese Premier League side Pietà Hotspurs, where he played as a defender.

Playing career
On 30 August 2008, Maltese First Division side Vittoriosa Stars announced the signing of Pierre Aquilina, the defender who had played his whole career for Pietà Hotspurs, since he made his debut during the 1996–97 season, signed a three-year contract with the Stars.

External links
 

Living people
1977 births
Maltese footballers
Malta international footballers
Pietà Hotspurs F.C. players
Vittoriosa Stars F.C. players
Association football defenders